The 2003 Kentucky Derby was the 129th running of the Kentucky Derby. The race took place on May 3, 2003 and was won by longshot Funny Cide. There were 148,530 in attendance.

Contenders
Sportswriter Steve Haskin called the 2003 Derby contenders a "perplexing group". The horses with the best form at age two (Vindication, Toccet, and Sky Mesa) all got injured while preparing for the Derby and ultimately missed the race. Instead, later developing colts dominated the final major preps in March and April. The clear favorite was Empire Maker, who had won both the Florida Derby and Wood Memorial. Empire Maker was at 6–5 on the morning line but drifted out to 5-2 by post-time based on concerns about a bruise to his right front hoof in the final days of training. Peace Rules was the second choice at odds of 6-1 after winning the Louisiana Derby and Blue Grass Stakes. Both horses were trained by Bobby Frankel, a Hall of Fame inductee who had never won a Triple Crown event. Other leading contenders included Buddy Gil (Santa Anita Derby), Ten Most Wanted (Illinois Derby), and Scrimshaw (Lexington Stakes).

Funny Cide was a moderate longshot at odds of 13–1. Bred in New York, Funny Cide won all three starts at age two in restricted stakes company and was named the New York bred champion two-year-old colt or gelding. When moved to open stakes company at age three, he ran fifth in the Holy Bull Stakes to Offlee Wild, second to Peace Rules in the Louisiana Derby and second to Empire Maker in the Wood Memorial.

Sir Cherokee was originally entered but was scratched by the track veterinarian.

Full results
Brancusi, Peace Rules and Eye of the Tiger went to the early lead and set moderately-fast fractions of 22.78 seconds for the first quarter mile and 46.23 for the first half. Funny Cide was bumped at the start but moved into tracking position going around the first turn while Empire Maker rated in eighth place. Peace Rules went to the lead on the far turn while Funny Cide moved into second and Empire Maker into third. Turning into the stretch, jockey José A. Santos went to the whip and Funny Cide opened a clear lead, then held on to win by  lengths. Empire Maker finished a head in front of stablemate Peace Rules for second. The time of 2:01.19 was the 10th fastest running in Derby history.

The race set a number of firsts. Funny Cide was the first gelding to win the race since Clyde Van Dusen in 1929. It was the first time a New York-bred had won the Kentucky Derby. It was the first win for Santos in seven attempts, and the first for trainer Barclay Tagg. It was also the first major win for Funny Cide's owners, six friends from upper New York state who named their outfit Sackatoga Stable after their hometown Sackett's Harbor and favorite racetrack, Saratoga. "We are a three-horse stable", said one of the partners, Jackson Knowlton. "We are the little guys in the game. Everyone who dreams in this game, who owns two or five horses, look at what you can accomplish. Little did we know."

Track condition: Fast

Times:  mile – 22.78;  mile – 46.23;  mile – 1:10.48; mile – 1:35.75; final – 2:01.19.
Splits for each quarter-mile: (22.78) (23.45) (24.25) (25.27) (25.44)

Source: Equibase Chart

Payout
The 129th Kentucky Derby Payout Schedule

 $2 Exacta: (6-12)  Paid   $97.00
 $2 Trifecta: (6-12-5)  Paid   $664.80
 $1 Superfecta: (6-12-5-4)  Paid   $2,795.80

Controversy
On the Thursday after the race, the Miami Herald published a photo that supposedly showed Santos holding a "buzzer" (a device that administers an electric shock to horses, intended to make them run faster). The story became national news and prompted a meeting of the Churchill Downs' stewards. In the photo, there was a dark area between Santos' hand and the whip. The Associated Press subsequently published another photo that clearly showed Santos held no such device: the dark area in the original photo may have been the green silks of the runner-up Empire Maker. Santos was officially cleared a few days later. "I'm thankful this nightmare is over", he said. "A week ago was the happiest moment of my life, and then this photograph came along and nearly ruined my life."

Subsequent racing careers
Several horses went on to record Grade I wins after the Derby:
 Funny Cide – Preakness Stakes, 2004 Jockey Club Gold Cup
 Empire Maker – Belmont Stakes
 Peace Rules – Haskell Invitational, 2004 Suburban Handicap
 Ten Most Wanted – Travers Stakes
 Offlee Wild – 2005 Suburban Handicap

Subsequent breeding careers
Leading progeny of participants in the 2003 Kentucky Derby
Empire Maker
 Royal Delta – 2011 Breeders' Cup Ladies Classic, Alabama Stakes, 2012 Breeders' Cup Ladies Classic, Beldame Stakes, 2013 Delaware Handicap, Personal Ensign
 Pioneerof the Nile – 2009 Santa Anita Derby, 2nd in Kentucky Derby, 2008 CashCall Futurity
 Bodemeister – 2012 Arkansas Derby, 2nd in both Kentucky Derby and Preakness Stakes
 Emollient – 2013 Ashland Stakes, American Oaks, Spinster Stakes, 2014 Rodeo Drive Stakes
 Grace Hall – Spinaway Stakes

Offlee Wild
 Bayern – 2014 Breeders' Cup Classic, Haskell Invitational
 She Be Wild – 2009 Breeders' Cup Juvenile Fillies

References

2003
Kentucky Derby
Derby
May 2003 sports events in the United States